Events in the year 1923 in the British Mandate of Palestine.

Incumbents
 High Commissioner – Sir Herbert Louis Samuel
 Emir of Transjordan – Abdullah I bin al-Hussein
 Prime Minister of Transjordan – 'Ali Rida Basha al-Rikabi until 1 February; Mazhar Raslan (acting prime minister) until 5 September; Hasan Khalid Abu al-Huda

Events

 15 May – Britain recognizes Transjordan as an independent government, although it still remains part of the British Mandate of Palestine.
 16–20 June – Sixth Palestine Arab Congress held in Jaffa.
 26 September – The British Mandate for Palestine, a legal instrument for the administration of Palestine, confirmed by the Council of the League of Nations on 24 July 1922, comes into effect.

Unknown dates
 The founding of Ramat HaSharon, at the time named Ir Shalom (lit. City of Peace), by a group of Jewish immigrants from Poland.

Notable births

 21 February - Avraham Biton, Israeli politician (died 2005).
 6 March - Gideon Ben-Yisrael, Israeli politician (died 2014).
 10 March - Shmuel Tamir, Israeli lawyer and politician (died 1987).
 13 March – Eliezer Kashani, Irgun fighter, one of the Olei Hagardom (died 1947).
 7 June – Uzzi Ornan, Israeli linguist (died 2022).
 20 July – Mattityahu Peled, Israeli general and peace activist (died 1995).
 2 September – Moshe Kelman, Israeli military officer (died 1980).
 12 September – Aviad Yafeh, Israeli politician (died 1977).
 15 September – Yosef Harish, Israeli jurist, Attorney General of Israel (died 2013).
 27 September – Meir Avizohar, Israeli politician (died 2008).
 9 October – Haim Gouri, Israeli poet, novelist, journalist and documentary filmmaker (died 2018).

Notable deaths

References

 
Palestine
Years in Mandatory Palestine